

The Austin Kestrel was a British two-seat biplane designed and built by the Austin Motor Company. Only one aircraft was built.

Design and development
Designed to enter a 1920 Air Ministry competition the Kestrel was a conventional biplane with an open cockpit with side-by-side seats for two. Registered G-EATR the Kestrel came third in the small aeroplane class. The company decided to concentrate on motor car production and the aircraft was sold in 1924 but not flown again.

Specifications

References

Notes

Bibliography

External links
Austin Memories: Aircraft Production

1920s British civil utility aircraft
Kestrel
Abandoned civil aircraft projects of the United Kingdom
Aircraft first flown in 1920